Liktse is a village in Leh district of the Indian union territory of Ladakh. It is located in the Nyoma tehsil.

Demographics
According to the 2011 census of India, Liktse has 28 households. The literacy rate of the village is 70.39%.

References 

Villages in Nyoma tehsil